A Night in Venice (German: Eine Nacht in Venedig) is a 1953 Austrian operetta film directed by Georg Wildhagen and starring Hans Olden, Jeanette Schultze and Peter Pasetti. It is adapted from the 1883 operetta Eine Nacht in Venedig by Johann Strauss, which had previously been turned into a 1934 film A Night in Venice directed by Robert Wiene.

The film was shot in the Soviet-controlled Rosenhügel Studios in Vienna.

Cast
 Hans Olden as Herzog Guido von Urbino  
 Jeanette Schultze as Annina 
 Peter Pasetti as Coramello 
 Marianne Schönauer as Barbara Delaqua 
 Alfred Neugebauer as Senator Delaqua 
 Lotte Lang as Ciboletta  
 Hermann Thimig as Pappacoda 
 Egon von Jordan as Benvenuto  
 Annie Rosar as Agricola Barbuccio  
 Joseph Egger as Barbuccio  
 Julia Drapal as Petronella / Solo Tänzerin  
 Hugo Gottschlich as Francesco  
 Heinrich Schweiger as Enrico

References

Bibliography 
 Goble, Alan. The Complete Index to Literary Sources in Film. Walter de Gruyter, 1999.

External links 
 

1953 films
Austrian historical musical films
1950s historical musical films
1950s German-language films
Films directed by Georg Wildhagen
Operetta films
Films based on operettas
Films set in Venice
Films set in the 18th century
Films shot at Rosenhügel Studios
Films scored by Nico Dostal